Peoria Charter Coach Company is a family-owned bus company based in Peoria, Illinois, which provides charter bus services, custom group tours, and transportation from several universities in Illinois to Chicago suburbs and airports. It is a contract charter bus service provider for the University of Illinois Urbana-Champaign.

History 

Peoria Charter Coach Company was founded in 1941 by Walter Winkler, who traded in the family car and received a loan from his sister to buy a bus to shuttle Caterpillar workers between Spring Bay and a new factory in Peoria, when gas was rationed during World War II. In 1979, Winkler stepped down and his sons Roger and Stanley took over the business. In 1990, Roger bought Stanley's share of the business when the latter retired. In 1999, Roger's son William and his wife Cindy took over the business, buying it from Roger.

In 2010, Peoria Charter opened a new terminal in Urbana. In 2013, the company moved its pick up location in Joliet from the Joliet Mall parking lot to the Union Station parking lot, in order to meet customers' demand for overnight parking.

The company introduced online ticketing in 2010.

On July 15, 2020, Peoria Charter Coach announced that it had laid off all but eight of its 140 employees in response to declining revenues due to the COVID-19 pandemic. On social media, co-owner Jingning (James) Wang stated that Peoria Charter's monthly overhead was $300,000 versus only $25,000 in revenue.

Services 

Peoria Charter serves five universities - University of Illinois at Urbana-Champaign, Illinois State University, Western Illinois University, Illinois Wesleyan University, Bradley University. It provides transportation from these universities to Chicago suburbs, and to Chicago O'Hare and Midway airports. It also provides inter-city transportation to people in Chicago suburbs, Peoria, Urbana, Champaign, Bloomington, Normal, and Joliet. It organizes group tours to various locations in Illinois and mainland United States, and to international destinations.

Peoria Charter is one of the two approved contract charter bus service providers for the University of Illinois at Urbana-Champaign, the other being Monticello Bus Company.

Awards and distinctions 

In 1995, Peoria Charter won the Mississippi Valley Family Business of the Year award. In 2003, it received an honorable mention distinction for Better Business Bureau's International Torch Award for marketplace ethics, a competition in which there were 1,500 contestants. In 2012, it received a  Department of Defense safety certification from Trailways.

Fatal Accidents

On Friday, January 27, 1995, a Peoria Charter bus collided with a church van on foggy Monticello Road in Savoy, IL. The van burst into flames and seven children perished.  A subsequent investigation found that the bus was being driven by a driver who was close to being in violation of DOT hours of service regulations. "The bus was transporting stranded air travellers whose flights were cancelled in St. Louis." according to the Gazette.

See also
 List of intercity bus stops in Illinois

References

External links 

 Peoria Charter — official site

Transport companies established in 1941
1941 establishments in Illinois
Companies based in Peoria, Illinois
Intercity bus companies of the United States
Transportation in Peoria County, Illinois
Transportation companies based in Illinois